Raymond "Bud" Somerville (born January 27, 1937 in Superior, Wisconsin) is an American curler. He is a two-time World champion, and five time American champion.

Somerville was the first inductee to the United States Curling Hall of Fame in 1984.

Curling career
Somerville won his first American championship in 1965, qualifying his team for the 1965 Scotch Cup, the World Curling championships at the time. His team won the event, defeating Canada's Terry Braunstein in the final, making Somerville the first skip from outside of Canada to win a World championship.

In 1968, Somerville won his second U.S. championship. At the 1968 Air Canada Silver Broom (the world championship), Somerville won the bronze medal after losing to Canada's Ron Northcott, 12–2 in the semi-final. The following year, Somerville won his third U.S. championship, and at the 1969 Air Canada Silver Broom, he lost once again to Canada's Northcott, this time in the final, 9–6.

In 1974, Somerville won his fourth U.S. championship. At the 1974 Air Canada Silver Broom, Somerville claimed his second and last World Championship, defeating Sweden's Jan Ullsten 11–4 in the final.

Somerville won his last U.S. championship in 1981. He once again won a medal at the 1981 Air Canada Silver Broom. He won a silver after losing to Switzerland's Jürg Tanner, 2–1 in the final.

Somerville also played in the 1988 and 1992 Winter Olympics, when curling was a demonstration sport. He finished fourth place in 1988, and won a bronze medal in 1992. 1995 would mark his last World Championship appearance, when he was alternate for his son Tim's team.

Personal life
Bud's son, Tim is also an American champion, having won the U.S. nationals 1995, 1996 and 1999.

References

External links

USA curl Biography

Living people
1937 births
Sportspeople from Superior, Wisconsin
American male curlers
World curling champions
Curlers at the 1992 Winter Olympics
American curling champions